Desert Encounter is a book written by the Danish journalist Knud Holmboe, who had converted to Islam.

Desert Encounter describes a trip across the Sahara made in 1930 by Knud Holmboe in an old Chevrolet. In the book, he condemns the colonial regimes of North Africa and particularly the Italian colonial government that terrorized the Muslim population in Libya. Desert Encounter was immediately banned in Fascist Italy. Suspicions that Knud Holmboe was murdered by Italian intelligence because of the book's content have never been verified.

It was published by Darf Publishers Ltd in 1931.

External links
 PDF file of the book in English and Arabic

1931 non-fiction books
Danish non-fiction books
Travel books
Books about the Sahara